John J. Gallagher (April 13, 1890 – May 13, 1950) was an American long-distance runner. He competed in the marathon at the 1912 Summer Olympics.

He later attended Georgetown University, becoming captain of its track team. He left school, and became physical director for the Chester Shipbuilding Company in Chester, Pennsylvania in April 1918.

References

External links
 

1890 births
1950 deaths
Athletes (track and field) at the 1912 Summer Olympics
American male long-distance runners
American male marathon runners
Olympic track and field athletes of the United States
Track and field athletes from Philadelphia
20th-century American people